The following units and commanders fought in the Battle of Brandy Station of the American Civil War on the Confederate side. The Union order of battle is shown separately. Order of battle compiled from the army organization during the battle.

Abbreviations used

Military rank
 MG = Major General
 BG = Brigadier General
 Col = Colonel
 Ltc = Lieutenant Colonel
 Maj = Major
 Cpt = Captain

Other
 (w) = wounded
 (k) = killed in action

Army of Northern Virginia

Cavalry Division

Notes

References
 The Battle of Brandy Station
 U.S. War Department, The War of the Rebellion: a Compilation of the  Official Records of the Union and Confederate Armies. Washington, DC: U.S. Government Printing Office, 1880–1901.

American Civil War orders of battle